Joseph Hinxman (c. 1701–1740), of the New Forest, Hampshire, was a British lawyer and politician who sat in the House of Commons from 1727 to 1740.

Hinxman was the eldest son of Joseph Hinxman of North Hinton, Hampshire. He was educated at Winchester College from 1715 to 1719 and was admitted at Lincoln's Inn on 24 June 1720. He matriculated at Trinity College, Oxford on 28 February 1721, aged 19  and was called to the bar in 1727. He owned the manor of North Hinton, near Christchurch and married Beata.

Hinxman stood unsuccessfully for Christchurch  at a by-election  in 1724.  At the 1727 British general election, he was returned as Member of Parliament for Christchurch in a contest. He voted with the Administration in all recorded divisions. He was returned unopposed for Christchurch at the  1734 British general election. He was sometime woodward and keeper of the New Forest.
  
Hinxman died on 21 March 1740, leaving three sons and two daughters.

References

1700s births
1740 deaths
Members of the Parliament of Great Britain for English constituencies
British MPs 1727–1734
British MPs 1734–1741